James Ford (born 23 October 1981) is an English footballer who played in The Football League for Bournemouth and last played for Winchester City.

Away from his career in football, Ford is employed as business development manager at Southampton.

References

1981 births
Living people
Footballers from Portsmouth
Association football midfielders
English footballers
AFC Bournemouth players
Dorchester Town F.C. players
Havant & Waterlooville F.C. players
Bognor Regis Town F.C. players
New Milton Town F.C. players
Chichester City F.C. players
Gosport Borough F.C. players
Petersfield Town F.C. players
Blackfield & Langley F.C. players
Winchester City F.C. players
English Football League players